The Unggarranggu, also traditionally transcribed as Ongkarango, are an Aboriginal Australian people of the Kimberley region of Western Australia.

Along with the Yawijibaya people, they are the traditional owners of Buccaneer Archipelago, off Derby, together known as the Mayala group for native title purposes.

Language
The Unggarranggu spoke a Worrorran language.  What little is known of it was taken down by Howard Coate in the 1960s.

Country
They also were present on Helpman Island and those islands of the eastern part of the sound as far as Caffarelli.

Society
The Unggarranggu were basically a coastal people dwelling on the mainland, but were on close terms with the more maritime Umiida. Like the Umiida they plied rafts fashioned from mangrove woods, with which they would sail out to places like the island of Wilima off the mouth of Meda River, close to Warrwa territory.

Alternative names
 Ongkarang.
 0kwata.
 Unggarangi.

Notes

Citations

Sources

Aboriginal peoples of Western Australia